The women's sprint competition at the Biathlon World Championships 2019 was held on 8 March 2019.

Results
The race was started at 16:15.

References

Women's sprint